The Benin Davis Cup team represents Benin in Davis Cup tennis competition and are governed by the Fédération Beninoise de Lawn Tennis.

Benin currently compete in Africa Zone Group III.

History
Benin competed in its first Davis Cup in 1993.  Their best result was 6th place in Group III in 1999.

Current team (2022) 

 Alexis Klégou 
 Sylvestre Monnou
 Patrick Agbo-Panzo

See also
Davis Cup

External links

Davis Cup teams
Davis Cup
Davis Cup